Nagashima was a series of Ikkō-ikki fortresses in Japan.

Nagashima may also refer to:

Places
Nagashima, Kagoshima, a town in Kagoshima Prefecture
Nagashima Island, Kagoshima
Nagashima, Mie, a former town in Mie Prefecture
Nagashima Spa Land, an amusement park
Nagashima Station, a railway station
 Nagashima Dam
 Nagashima Dam Station

People with the surname
, Japanese sport wrestler
Hiroshi Nagashima (born 1966), Japanese boxer
Kazushige Nagashima (born 1966), professional baseball player, son of Shigeo Nagashima
, Japanese speed skater
Shigeo Nagashima (born 1936), professional baseball player
Yūichi Nagashima (born 1957), Japanese voice actor and actor
Yuichiro Nagashima (born 1984), Japanese kick boxer and cosplayer
Yūko Nagashima (born 1969), Japanese voice actress
Yurie Nagashima (born 1973), photographer

See also
Nagashima Ohno & Tsunematsu, a law firm

Japanese-language surnames